Evgeniy Maloletka is a Ukrainian journalist and photographer. He covered the siege of Mariupol during the Russian invasion of Ukraine, and, in particular, made a photograph of a woman wounded as a result of the maternity hospital bombing, considered to be iconic.

Maloletka was born in Berdiansk. He studied electronics at Igor Sikorsky Kyiv Polytechnic Institute and graduated in 2010. In 2009, he started as a staff photographer for UNIAN. Later, he worked as a freelancer and collaborated with the Associated Press, Al Jazeera, and Der Spiegel, among others.

In 2020-21, Maloletka covered the COVID-19 pandemic in Ukraine. In particular, his photo of the doctor Evhen Venzhynovych was widely used for social advertisement.

In February and March 2022, during the Russian invasion of Ukraine, the Associated Press staff member Mstyslav Chernov and Maloletka, a freelancer working for AP, stayed in Mariupol, which was encircled by the Russian troops, under siege,  and extensively bombed, whereas the Russian Ministry of Foreign Affairs and the Defense Ministry claimed that Russia only targets military installations. Chernov and Maloletka were among the few journalists, and, according to the AP, the only international journalists in Mariupol during that period, and their photographs were extensively used by Western media to cover the situation. According to Chernov, on 11 March they were in a hospital taking photos when they were taken of the city with the assistance of Ukrainian soldiers. They managed to escape from Mariupol unharmed.

On 23 May 2022 Maloletka, together with Chernov and Vasilisa Stepanenko, received the Knight International Journalism Award for their work in Mariupol, as announced by the International Center for Journalists. In September 2022, he won the Visa d'Or Award.

References

Living people
Ukrainian photographers
Year of birth missing (living people)